Los tigres del desierto ("The Desert Tigers") is a 1960 Mexican comedy film starring Viruta and Capulina (Marco Antonio Campos and Gaspar Henaine), Donna Behar, Lorena Velázquez, and Rodolfo Landa.

External links

Mexican comedy films
Films with screenplays by Roberto Gómez Bolaños
1960s Mexican films